Stop, Look and Love is a 1939 American comedy film directed by Otto Brower and starring Jean Rogers, William Frawley, and Robert Kellard.

See also
The Family Upstairs (1926)
Harmony at Home (1930)

References

External links
Stop, Look and Love at the Internet Movie Database

1939 films
American comedy films
1939 comedy films
Films directed by Otto Brower
American black-and-white films
American films based on plays
Remakes of American films
20th Century Fox films
1930s American films